Emilee Sukja O'Neil (born March 26, 1983) is an American soccer player who plays as a midfielder and a defender. She most recently played for the Portland Thorns FC of the National Women's Soccer League.

Career

Youth and college career

O'Neil attended Stanford University where she majored in Human Biology.

Professional career
O'Neil came to the Portland Thorns FC as a trialist before being named to their opening day roster for the inaugural 2013 season with the National Women's Soccer League. February 8, 2014, the Portland Thorns released O'Neil.

Personal
Parents Tom Shim and Martha Abbott-Shim. Stepped away from soccer after graduating from Stanford. Married husband Michael O'Neil in 2009.

References

External links
 Portland Thorns FC player profile
 Stanford University player profile

1983 births
Living people
American women's soccer players
Stanford Cardinal women's soccer players
Portland Thorns FC players
National Women's Soccer League players
Women's association football defenders
Women's association football midfielders